Abby Stubbert (born June 4, 1988) is a Canadian Paralympic wheelchair basketball player from Halifax, Nova Scotia who won a gold medal in the 2009  Artland Open which was hosted in Quakenbruck, Germany and a 2011 silver medal at Osaka Cup which was hosted in Osaka, Japan.

Early life and education
Stubbert graduated from St. Francis Xavier University.

Career
In 2011, Stubbert was a part of the Canada women's national wheelchair basketball team at the 2011 Women's U25 Wheelchair Basketball World Championship.

References

1988 births
Living people
Sportspeople from Halifax, Nova Scotia
Canadian women's wheelchair basketball players